The administrator of Norfolk Island acts as a representative both of The Crown and of the Government of Australia, as well as carrying out other duties according to the Norfolk Island Amendment Act 2015. Since its construction in 1829, Government House located in KAVHA, Kingston has been the residence of the governors, commandants, and administrators of Norfolk Island.

See also
History of Norfolk Island
List of heads of government of Norfolk Island

References

Norfolk Island administrative heads
 Administrative heads
 List